La Cordée des Alpes is four star hotel situated in the village Verbier, in the canton Valais, Switzerland. It was built in 2012 and it is part of KV HOTELS.

The hotel is a member of a group small luxury hotels (SLH).

The hotel features a spa Cinq Mondes and a bistronomic restaurant.

References

External links 
 KV HOTELS
 Cordée des Alpes

Hotels in Switzerland
Buildings and structures in Valais